Steve Waters is a British playwright. He was born in Coventry, UK. He studied English at Oxford University, taught in secondary schools and was a graduate of David Edgar's MA in Playwriting in 1993, a course which he later ran for several years. He has written about the pedagogy of playwriting, contributed articles to The Guardian, essays to The Blackwell Companion to Modern British and Irish Drama and The Cambridge Companion to Harold Pinter, and has written a book entitled, The Secret Life of Plays (2010).

Plays 
 English Journeys (1998)
 After The Gods (2002)
 World Music (2003)
 The Unthinkable (2004)
 Fast Labour (2008)
 The Contingency Plan (2009)
 Little Platoons (2011)
 Ignorance/ Jahiliyyah (2012)
 The Air Gap (2012) A radio play broadcast by BBC Radio 4.
 Bretton Woods  (2014) Broadcast on BBC Radio 3.
 Scribblers (2015) BBC Radio 3
 Temple (2015)
 The Play About Calais (2016)
 Limehouse (2017)
 The Fall of the Shah (2019) 
 The Last King of Scotland (2019)
 Miriam and Youssef (2020)

Collaborative Works
The Bush Theatre's 2011 project Sixty Six Books used the King James Bible as inspiration for new theatre. Waters wrote the short play, Capernaum. 
He adapted and translated Habitats by Philippe Minyana. 
He collaborated with the Menagerie Theatre Company, with Out of Your Knowledge (2005-8) and Offstage Theatre Company, with Amphibians (2011).

References

Sources
Theatre review: The Contingency Plan, Bush, London

British dramatists and playwrights
Living people
British male dramatists and playwrights
Year of birth missing (living people)